The Sierra de las Uvas or Grape Mountains are a mountain range in Doña Ana County, New Mexico. The John D. Dingell, Jr. Conservation, Management, and Recreation Act, signed March 12, 2019, authorized the establishment of the Sierra de las Uvas Wilderness as a component of the National Wilderness Preservation System, protecting approximately 11,114 acres in the Organ Mountains-Desert Peaks National Monument.

References

External links
Sierra de las Uvas Wilderness - Wilderness Connect

Mountain ranges of Doña Ana County, New Mexico
Mountain ranges of New Mexico
Organ Mountains–Desert Peaks National Monument